Season one of the 2013 edition of El Gran Show premiered on May 18, 2013.

Since Week 4, like last season, the procedure in the duel was the same, the sentenced couple that gets the highest score is the save, with the difference that the votes of the public would award 2 extra points, in addition the judges' scores were secret, being only shown the vote of the judge that couples choose. The modality of coaches also continued, with choreographers Arturo Chumbe and César "Chechi" Yáñez.

On August 10, 2013, actress Emilia Drago and Sergio Lois were declared the winners, journalist and TV host Víctor Hugo Dávila and Lindathay Valero finished second, while model and TV host Claudia Portocarrero and Joel Velázquez were third.

Cast

Couples 
On May 10, 2013 celebrities were presented at a press conference, one of them was one of the show producers, Jaime "Choca" Mandros (being, after Denny Valdeiglesias in the second season of 2011, the second production member to participate). The professional dancers were presented in the first week, among them returned Jacqueline Alfaro, Angelo Cano, Emanuel Colombo and Sergio Lois. Arturo Chumbe and César "Chechi" Yáñez were the coaches.

Due to an injury, model Edith Tapia had to withdraw from the competition before it started. Even so, it was announced that she would be part of the cast of next season.

Host and judges 
Gisela Valcárcel and Aldo Díaz returned as hosts, while Paco Bazán replaced Óscar López Arias as co-host. In addition, the actress Gachi Rivero worked as a reporter for the show. Morella Petrozzi, Carlos Cacho, Pachi Valle Riestra and the VIP Jury returned as judges while Rosanna Lignarolo did not return. From the third week, journalist Phillip Butters joined the panel as the fourth judge to replace Lignarolo.

Scoring charts 

Red numbers indicate the sentenced for each week
Green numbers indicate the best steps for each week
 the couple was eliminated that week
 the couple was safe in the duel
 the couple was eliminated that week and safe with a lifeguard
 the winning couple
 the runner-up couple
 the third-place couple

Average score chart
This table only counts dances scored on a 40-point scale (the VIP jury scores since Week 3 are excluded).

Highest and lowest scoring performances 
The best and worst performances in each dance according to the judges' 40-point scale (the VIP jury scores since Week 3 are excluded) are as follows:

Couples' highest and lowest scoring dances 
Scores are based upon a potential 40-point maximum (the VIP jury scores since Week 3 are excluded).

Weekly scores 
Individual judges' scores in the charts below (given in parentheses) are listed in this order from left to right: Morella Petrozzi, Carlos Cacho, Pachi Valle Riestra, VIP Jury.

Week 1: First Dances 
The couples danced cumbia, disco, latin pop, pachanga, reggaeton or salsa. This week, none couples were sentenced.
Running order

Week 2: Party Night
The couples performed one unlearned dance.
Running order

Week 3: The '80s Night 
Individual judges' scores in the charts below (given in parentheses) are listed in this order from left to right: Morella Petrozzi, Carlos Cacho, Phillip Butters, Pachi Valle Riestra, VIP Jury.

The couples (except those sentenced) performed one unlearned dance to famous '80s songs.
Running order

*The duel
William & Diana: Eliminated
Puchungo & Vania: Safe

Week 4: Cumbia & Jazz Night
The couples (except those sentenced) danced cumbia or jazz and a danceathon of cumbia.
Running order

*The duel
Mariella & Angelo: Safe (2pts)
André & Nazareth: Safe
Puchungo & Vania: Eliminated (but safe with the lifeguard)

Week 5: Pachanga & Salsa Night 
The couples (except those sentenced) danced pachanga or salsa and a team dance of k-pop.
Running order

*The duel
Joshua & Yamila: Eliminated
André & Nazareth: Safe (2pts)
Puchungo & Vania: Safe

Week 6: World Dances Night 
The couples (except those sentenced) performed the world dances and a team dance of hula.
Running order

*The duel
Lucía & Emanuel: Eliminated
Puchungo & Vania: Safe (2pts)

Week 7: Movie Night 
The couples (except those sentenced) performed one unlearned ballroom dance to famous film songs. In the versus, the couples faced dancing different dance styles.
Running order

*The duel
André & Nazareth: Eliminated (but safe with the lifeguard)
Choca & Jacqueline: Safe (2pts)

Week 8: Latin Rock Night
The couples (except those sentenced) danced jive with latin rock music. In the versus, the couples faced dancing disco.
Running order

*The duel
André & Nazareth: Safe
Puchungo & Vania: Eliminated (2pts)

Week 9: Glam Metal Night 
The couples (except those sentenced) danced a fusion dance that fused two dance styles with glam metal music. In the little train, the participants faced dancing strip dance.
Running order

*The duel
Choca & Jacqueline: Eliminated (but safe with the lifeguard) (2pts)
Mariella & Angelo: Eliminated
Claudia & Joel: Safe

Week 10: Cumbia Night 
The couples (except those sentenced) danced cumbia. In the versus, the couples faced dancing adagio.
Running order

*The duel
Josetty & Juan: Safe
Víctor Hugo & Lindathay: Safe (2pts)
André & Nazareth: Eliminated

Week 11: Quarterfinals 
The couples danced cumbia (except those sentenced), adagio and a danceathon of festejo.
Running order

*The duel
Choca & Jacqueline: Eliminated (2pts)
Claudia & Joel: Safe

Week 12: Semifinals 
The couples danced quebradita (except those sentenced) and trio salsa involving another celebrity. In the little train, the participants faced dancing strip dance. This week, none couples were sentenced.
Running order

*The duel
Josetty & Juan: Eliminated
Víctor Hugo & Lindathay: Safe (2pts)

Week 13: Finals 
On the first part, the couples danced cumbia and a freestyle performed in a rotating room.

On the second part, the final two couples danced quickstep.
Running order (Part 1)

Running order (Part 2)

Dance chart
The celebrities and professional partners will dance one of these routines for each corresponding week:
 Week 1: Cumbia, disco, latin pop, pachanga, reggaeton, or salsa (First Dances)
 Week 2: One unlearned dance (Party Night)
 Week 3: One unlearned dance (The '80s Night)
 Week 4: Cumbia or jazz & the danceathon (Cumbia & Jazz Night)
 Week 5: Pachanga or salsa & team dances (Pachanga & Salsa Night)
 Week 6: One unlearned dance & team dances (World Dances Night)
 Week 7: Ballroom dances & the versus (Movie Night)
 Week 8: Jive & the versus (Latin Rock Night)
 Week 9: Fusion dance & the little train (Glam Metal Night)
 Week 10: Cumbia & the versus (Cumbia Night)
 Week 11: Cumbia, adagio & the danceathon (Quarterfinals)
 Week 12: Quebradita, trio salsa & the little train (Semifinals)
 Week 13: Cumbia, freestyle & quickstep (Finals)

 Highest scoring dance
 Lowest scoring dance
 Gained bonus points for winning this dance
 Gained no bonus points for losing this dance
In Italic indicate the dances performed in the duel

Notes

References

External links 

El Gran Show
2013 Peruvian television seasons
Reality television articles with incorrect naming style